Fannaråkbreen is a glacier in the municipality of Luster in Vestland county, Norway. The glacier covers the eastern and northern sides of the mountain of Fannaråki, and is located within the Jotunheimen National Park.

See also
List of glaciers in Norway

References

Glaciers of Vestland
Luster, Norway